Raosaheb Ramrao Patil, better known as R. R. Patil (16 August 1957 – 16 February 2015) was an Indian politician from the state of Maharashtra. He was an MLA for Tasgaon vidhan sabha constituency from 1991 to 2015. He was an important leader of  modern Maharashtra. He was a member of the Nationalist Congress Party. He became Home Minister of Maharashtra for the second time after the 2009 Maharashtra assembly election victory of the Congress-NCP alliance. He was also the former Deputy Chief Minister of Maharashtra.

Early life
R. R. Patil, popularly known as "Aaba", (Marathi :आबा) was born on 16 August 1957 in the village of Anjani, in the Tasgaon taluka, Sangli district in the State of Maharashtra. Despite his father being the village head, their financial condition was not good. He completed most of his education under the government scheme of "Earn & Learn". He obtained a B.A. and an  LL.B. from Shantiniketan college in Sangli.

Career
Patil was a member of Sangli Zillah Parishad from 1979 to 1990 from Savlaj constituency, then was elected to the Maharashtra Legislative Assembly in 1990, 1995, 1999, 2004, 2009 and 2014 representing Tasgaon, in Sangli district. He became the Chief Whip of the Congress Party in the assembly as well as the chairman of the public accounts committee of the assembly in 1996–97 and 1998–99.

After 1999 Maharashtra Legislative Assembly election, he became the Rural Development Minister of Maharashtra in the Congress-NCP coalition government in October 1999. He became the Home Minister of Maharashtra on 25 December 2003. After taking charge of Home Ministry, he also sought guardianship of naxal activity affected district Gadchiroli. Since then, in spite of many naxal attacks, he encouraged natives to support elected government through some developmental work for them. On 1 November 2004, he was sworn in as the Deputy Chief Minister of Maharashtra. He was also the chief of the Nationalist Congress Party's Maharashtra unit and NCP legislative party in Maharashtra.  

He was the most respected politician in Maharashtra, also christened as 'Mr Clean' in political circles due to his clean image in the erstwhile tainted political party and also due to cleanliness awareness initiatives like "Gadage Baba Swachata Abhiyan" & "Tantamukt Gaon".

Controversy
His comments in the aftermath of the November 2008 Mumbai attacks have drawn severe criticism for downplaying the gravity of the situation. He was quoted as saying, "They (the terrorists) came to kill 5,000 people but we ensured minimal damage". Sources close to him have argued that his comments are being taken out of context and that he did not intend to downplay the grievous attack.

He resigned on 1 December 2008 after further remarks on the attacks. When asked at a press conference whether the terror strike was an intelligence failure Patil said, "It is not like that. In big cities like this, incidents like this do happen. It's [sic] is not a total failure." Patil's words drew flak from many quarters. Mumbai residents who saw him say this on television or were told about it by reporters pointed out the irony of politicians making such statements after being provided high security.

Death
Patil died at Lilavati Hospital and Research Centre after a long fight with oral cancer. Patil showed signs of improvement after his initial treatment and was taken off life support in January 2015, but he succumbed to the disease on 16 February 2015. The last rites were performed in Anjani village in Tasgaon area of Sangli district, Maharashtra on 17 February 2015. Patil's funeral was held with state honours, including a 21-gun salute by the Maharashtra government and was attended by the Maharashtra Chief Minister Devendra Fadnavis, Anna Hazare, Sharad Pawar and other political leaders from various parties.

References

External links

Aaba Patil's Blog
"R R Patil to be new Maharashtra Dy CM" - rediff.com article dated 29 October 2004
"R R Patil elected new deputy CM of Maharashtra" - HindustanTimes.com article dated 29 October 2004
Profile of R R Patil - HindustanTimes.com dated 29 October 2004
"R R Patil to be Maharashtra Dy CM" - Mid-Day article dated 29 October 2004
"R R Patil to become Maha DyCM" - Times of India article dated 29 October 2004isters of Indian states

1957 births
2015 deaths
Marathi politicians
Deputy Chief Ministers of Maharashtra
Nationalist Congress Party politicians from Maharashtra
People from Sangli district
Maharashtra MLAs 1990–1995
Maharashtra MLAs 1995–1999
Maharashtra MLAs 1999–2004
Maharashtra MLAs 2004–2009
Maharashtra MLAs 2009–2014
State cabinet ministers of Maharashtra
Maharashtra MLAs 2014–2019
Deaths from oral cancer
Deaths from cancer in India